WFHM-FM (95.5 FM) is a commercial radio station licensed to Cleveland, Ohio, known as "95.5 The Fish" and featuring a contemporary Christian format. Owned by the Salem Media Group, the station serves Greater Cleveland and much of surrounding Northeast Ohio. WFHM-FM's studios are located in the Cleveland suburb of Independence and the station transmitter resides in Warrensville Heights. In addition to a standard analog transmission, WFHM-FM is available online.

History

WDGO (1960–1962) 
WFHM-FM first launched on April 1, 1960, as WDGO. The station derived its call letters from its principal owner: Douglas G. Oviatt. The correct call sign for the station caused confusion among some listeners since the station used a Scotty dog as a logo, causing the letters sometimes to be transposed as WDOG.

The station was purchased in 1962 by C.K. "Pat" Patrick and Robert Conrad as an outlet for classical music. At the time, most large American cities had at least one commercial radio station that devoted either a large part or all of its broadcast day to classical programming; most non-commercial classical stations were operated by colleges and universities, established years before the advent of the National Public Radio network.

WCLV (1962–2001) 

Patrick and Conrad formed Radio Seaway, Inc., taking its name from the St. Lawrence Seaway, which had opened in 1959 and had made Cleveland an ocean port. The new owners wanted to shed the "WDOG" image and wanted a new callsign that would reflect their orientation toward community service to the greater Cleveland area. The initial choice was WCLE, as "CLE" was the International Air Transport Association airport code for Cleveland Hopkins International Airport. Those call signs also had a previous history in the market, as they were used on a daytime-only station owned by United Broadcasting, a company organized by The Plain Dealer's parent company, Forest City Publishing, in the 1930s. At the same time, United Broadcasting also owned WHK, which now broadcast on a full-time basis. Due to new regulations enacted that prohibited duopolies in a single market, WCLE was relocated to Akron, Ohio as station WHKK, which today broadcasts as WHLO.

However, the WCLE calls had already been taken by a station in Cleveland, Tennessee, and the WCLD calls were in use by a station in Cleveland, Mississippi. As a result, Patrick and Conrad opted for the call letters WCLV, and branded the station "WCLV 95/5" on November 1, 1962; the forward slash was always used in print instead of a point on the frequency number in station promotions and identification.

The station immediately launched an impressive, for its day, line-up of classical music programming. FM stereo broadcasts were begun on February 4, 1963, just three months after the debut. Two hour-long evening programming blocks also were unveiled within months of each other: first, the Symphony at Seven sponsored by Cleveland Trust on October 5, 1964, and the Heinen's Concert Hall on February 1, 1965. Concert Hall ended its run in 2003, while Symphony at Seven continues to this very day, its sponsorship carried over by Cleveland Trust's successors (Ameritrust, Society Bank and KeyBank).

One of WCLV's booth announcers, Martin Perlich, debuted the Perlich Project in late 1966 – a mixture of classical music with the early selections of progressive rock along with Perlich's own personal comments and editorials on events of the day. His show would gain renown as one of the earliest such shows on commercial radio, and as a model for the progressive rock medium itself.

In 1965, the station began broadcasting concerts of the Cleveland Orchestra on Sunday afternoons at 4:00 p.m. That time slot has remained virtually unchanged since. WCLV eventually started national distribution of the Orchestras' broadcasts to stations throughout the country, through its subsidiary syndication arm Seaway Productions. WCLV and Seaway also started to syndicate other programs, including Karl Haas' Adventures in Good Music (which ran from 1970 until 2007), and concert broadcasts of the Detroit Symphony, the Royal Amsterdam Concertgebouw Orchestra, the Rotterdam Philharmonic, and the San Francisco Symphony.

Studios were moved from the original location in the Eastgate Shopping Center in Mayfield Heights to downtown Cleveland's Terminal Tower in 1968, to Warrensville Heights in 1986, and finally to the current location in the Idea Center at Playhouse Square in Downtown Cleveland (as of December 2010).

The station did continue one traditional program from the old WDGO days. On Saturday night, WCLV broke away from its usual classical music programming to present an eclectic program of folk and novelty music and comedy called WCLV Saturday Night; the program was rebroadcast on Wednesday afternoon under the title WCLV Saturday Night on Wednesday Afternoon. The program also initiated some friendly feuding with rival classical music station WCRB in Boston. Hosted by WCLV President and longtime Cleveland Orchestra commentator Robert Conrad, WCLV Saturday Night spawned an hourlong syndicated version in 1982 titled Weekend Radio; it is still heard on numerous NPR-affiliated stations elsewhere in the U.S. By 1990, Conrad decided to retire the full three or so live hours on WCLV in favor of the hourlong version. At about the same time, he reformatted the show, substituting light classical pieces for the folk and novelty songs of past years.

Beginning in 1970, the station pre-empted regular programming for a week in September to broadcast requested concert recordings of the Cleveland Orchestra as a fund-raiser for the Orchestra, an event known as the "Cleveland Orchestra Marathon."

Under WCLV's classical music format, FM 95.5 won the National Association of Broadcasters Marconi Award for Classical Music Station of the Year in 1995.

2001 "frequency swap" 

On November 1, 2000, the 38th anniversary of WDGO's call sign change to WCLV, Radio Seaway announced the station's intellectual property and format would be donated to a newly-established nonprofit organization. To enable the donation, Radio Seaway sold WCLV's broadcast license to Salem Communications and purchased both the licenses to WHK from Salem and WAKS from Clear Channel, which in turn purchased the  facility licensed to Canton from Salem. Conrad and Radio Seaway partner Rich Marschner negotiated between the two chains for two years and saw the move as a means to perpetuate the classical format amidst ownership consolidation. When the donation was announced, the  license had an estimated value of $45 million (equivalent to $ in ), while the  license—a class A signal licensed to Lorain and with a tower in Avon—was valued at $8 million (equivalent to $ in ). Conrad later explained, "we were paid a lot to move WCLV from 95.5 to 104.9." Radio Seaway ultimately donated WCLV to ideastream, one of the partners behind the WCLV Foundation, on November 1, 2011.

While generally regarded as a "frequency swap", when the asset deals closed on July 3, 2001, WCLV changed format to contemporary Christian music (CCM) as "95.5 The Fish" under the WHK-FM call sign, while WAKS changed calls to WCLV-FM, bringing over the classical format intact and retaining all on- and off-air staff. WHK-FM was again renamed as WFHM-FM on August 16, 2001.

WFHM-FM (2001–present) 
Salem's installation of CCM on  followed the implementation of similar "Fish"-themed stations in Los Angeles, Chicago and Atlanta, with the brand alluding to Ichthys, a traditional Christian symbol. The move also returned the format to Greater Cleveland for the first time since May 1999, when Clear Channel changed 's format from CCM (under the WZLE calls) to contemporary hit radio as WAKS. The initial airstaff for "The Fish" included former WZLE operations manager Len Howser, along with secular radio personalities Dan Deely, Daune Robinson and Rob Schuler. Sue Wilson, a veteran programmer best known for her tenure at secular adult contemporary WDOK, was named as program director; Wilson emphasized that WFHM's format would be "... positive, uplifting music, and definitely spiritual, but it's not churchy, it's not preachy."

Among the station's earliest notable personalities under the CCM format was longtime Cleveland TV news anchor and former national talk show host Robin Swoboda, who co-hosted the WFHM morning show from 2002 to 2005.

Current programming
The Fish lineup features local DJs Len Howser and Sara Carnes (mornings), and Joe Cronauer (afternoons). Syndicated hosts include Kevin Avery and Taylor Scott middays (from Salem Music Network), and Penny Mitchell evenings (from Keep The Faith Radio).

WFHM-FM airs Christmas music during the holiday season.

References

External links

Cleveland Broadcast Radio Archives: WFHM-FM timeline

1960 establishments in Ohio
Contemporary Christian radio stations in the United States
Radio stations established in 1960
FHM-FM
Salem Media Group properties
FHM-FM